The Stipeae are a tribe of grasses within the subfamily Pooidae, with up to 600 described species.

Description
The defining morphological features of the Stipeae include single-flowered spikelets lacking a rachilla extension, and the lemmas (the external bract) have either a sharp point or a terminal awn (long bristle).

Genera
The tribe includes 28 genera:

Many species initially placed into Stipa have now been split off into new genera. Some recent papers have analysed relationships within and between the genera, but a complete analysis has not yet been performed. Stipoid grasses use the C3 photosynthetic pathway and live in temperate areas worldwide.

Known fossils date from the late Miocene.

References

External links 
 Stipa L. sensu lato (sensu lato refers to the tribe) The grass genera of the world website by L. Watson, T.D. Macfarlane, and M.J. Dallwitz

Pooideae
Poaceae tribes